Ousmane Camara (born 28 December 1998) is a Guinean professional footballer who plays for Erovnuli Liga club Dinamo Tbilisi.

Club career
On 13 January 2022, Dinamo Tbilisi announced the signing of Camara.

References

1998 births
Living people
Guinean footballers
Guinea youth international footballers
Association football forwards
AFC Eskilstuna players
Vålerenga Fotball players
FC Dila Gori players
FC Dinamo Tbilisi players
Superettan players
Allsvenskan players
Eliteserien players
Erovnuli Liga players
Guinean expatriate footballers
Expatriate footballers in Sweden
Guinean expatriate sportspeople in Sweden
Expatriate footballers in Norway
Guinean expatriate sportspeople in Norway
Expatriate footballers in Georgia (country)